Lukáš Rakowski (born 8 September 1982) is a Czech former competitive figure skater. He won two silver medals on the ISU Junior Grand Prix series and three Czech national senior titles (1999–2001). He reached the free skate at five ISU Championships, achieving his best result, 10th, at the 1998 World Junior Championships.

Programs

Results
JGP: Junior Series / Junior Grand Prix

References

External links
 

1982 births
Czech male single skaters
Sportspeople from Třinec
Living people
Competitors at the 2003 Winter Universiade
Competitors at the 2005 Winter Universiade